The England cricket team toured South Africa during November and December 2020 to play three One Day International (ODI) and three Twenty20 International (T20I) matches. However, the ODI matches were called off due to a COVID-19 outbreak. The ODI series would have formed part of the inaugural 2020–2023 ICC Cricket World Cup Super League.

Due to the COVID-19 pandemic, the England team stayed in a bio-secure environment whilst in South Africa, with the matches played in Cape Town and Paarl. In October 2020, Cricket South Africa (CSA) made a plea to its parliament, saying that is of "critical importance", while waiting on government approval for the tour to go ahead. On 21 October 2020, both cricket boards agreed to the series, with the full tour itinerary being confirmed.

England won the first two T20I matches to take an unassailable lead in the series. England won the third match by nine wickets to take the series 3–0, with the victory putting England at the top of the ICC T20I Championship.

The first ODI match, originally scheduled to be played on 4 December, was cancelled less than an hour before it was due to start, after a South African player tested positive for coronavirus. As a result, the fixture was moved back by two days. However, on 6 December, the rescheduled match was abandoned after two members of the hotel staff tested positive for coronavirus. Shortly after the match was called off, two members of England's touring party returned "unconfirmed positive tests" for the virus. Later the same day, the England and Wales Cricket Board (ECB) confirmed that the second ODI, scheduled for 7 December, would not be played on that date. On 7 December, the remainder of the ODI series was postponed. Both cricket boards agreed to work on hosting the ODI series at another time.

Squads

Jake Ball, Tom Banton, Tom Helm were also named as reserves for England across both formats. Kagiso Rabada was ruled out of South Africa's ODI squad after picking up a groin injury during the T20I series. South Africa also rested Faf du Plessis, Pite van Biljon, Bjorn Fortuin and Reeza Hendricks for the ODI series.

Practice matches
A South Africa intra-squad warm-up match, due to take place on 21 November, was cancelled after two players tested positive for coronavirus. A second match, scheduled to be played on 23 November, was also cancelled in an attempt to limit the impact of any possible infections. Conversely, England played one 40-over intra-squad match and one 20-over intra-squad match, with Jos Buttler and Eoin Morgan named as the team captains.

T20I series

1st T20I

2nd T20I

3rd T20I

ODI series

1st ODI

2nd ODI

3rd ODI

References

External links
 Series home at ESPN Cricinfo

2020 in English cricket
2020 in South African cricket
International cricket competitions in 2020–21
English cricket tours of South Africa
Cricket events curtailed due to the COVID-19 pandemic